Population projections are attempts to show how the human population statistics might change in the future. These projections are an important input to forecasts of the population's impact on this planet and humanity's future well-being. Models of population growth take trends in human development, and apply projections into the future. These models use trend-based-assumptions about how populations will respond to economic, social and technological forces to understand how they will affect fertility and mortality, and thus population growth.

The 2019 projections from the United Nations Population Division show that annual world population growth peaked at 2.1% in 1968, has since dropped to 1.1%, and could drop even further to 0.1% by 2100, which would be a growth rate not seen since pre-industrial revolution days. Based on this, the UN Population Division projects the world population, which is 8 billion , to level out around 2100 at 10.9 billion (the median line), assuming a continuing decrease in the global average fertility rate from 2.5 births per woman during the 2015–2020 period to 1.9 in 2095–2100, according to the medium-variant projection. A 2014 projection has the population continuing to grow into the next century.

However, estimates outside of the United Nations have put forward alternative models based on additional downward pressure on fertility (such as successful implementation of education and family planning goals in the Sustainable Development Goals) which could result in peak population during the 2060-2070 period rather than later. 

According to the UN, about two-thirds of the predicted growth in population between 2020 and 2050 will take place in Africa. It is projected that 50% of births in the 5-year period 2095-2100 will be in Africa. Other organizations project lower levels of population growth in Africa based particularly on improvement in women's education and successfully implementing family planning.

By 2100, the UN projects the population in Sub-Saharan Africa will reach 3.8 billion, IHME projects 3.1 billion, and IIASA is the lowest at 2.6 billion. In contrast to the UN projections, the models of fertility developed by IHME and IIASA incorporate women's educational attainment, and in the case of IHME, also assume successful implementation of family planning.

Because of population momentum the global population will continue to grow, although at a steadily slower rate, for the remainder of this century. The main driver of long-term future population growth is projected to be the evolution of the global average fertility rate.

History of population projections 
Projections of global human population are generally based on birth rates and death rates, and since these are difficult to predict very far into the future, forecasts of global population numbers and growth rates have changed over time. 

Walter Greiling projected in the 1950s that world population would reach a peak of about nine billion in the 21st century and then stop growing after an improvement in public health in less developed countries.

Estimates published in the early 2000s tended to predict that the population of Earth would stop increasing around 2070. For example in a 2004 long-term prospective report, the United Nations Population Division projected that world population would peak at 9.2 billion in 2075 and then stabilize at a value close to 9 billion out to as far as the year 2300.

Jørgen Randers, one of the authors of the seminal 1972 long-term simulations in The Limits to Growth, offered an alternative scenario in a 2012 book, arguing that traditional projections insufficiently take into account the downward impact of global urbanization on fertility. Randers' "most likely scenario" predicted a peak in world population in the early 2040s at about 8.1 billion people, followed by decline.

In 2014 the UN changed its prediction to the effect that no maximum would likely be reached in the 21st century, and that by the year 2100 world population would increase to somewhere in the range 9.6 to 12.3 billion. The main reason for the revision was a recognition that the high fertility rate in Africa was not declining as fast had been previously assumed.  Another 2014 paper by demographers from several universities using data from the UN’s 2014 report and their own statistical methods forecast that the world's population would reach about 10.9 billion in 2100 and continue growing thereafter. 

In 2017 the UN predicted that global population would reach 11.2 billion by 2100 and still be growing then at the rate of 0.1% per year.

The most recent 2022 revision of the UN’s World Population Prospects report expects that further slowing of the population growth rate will lead to a population peak of 10.4 billion in the 2080s, after which it would then begin to slowly fall.

Drivers of population change 
The population of a country or area grows or declines through the interaction of three demographic drivers: fertility, mortality, and migration.

Fertility 

Fertility is expressed as the total fertility rate (TFR), a measure of the number of children on average that a woman will bear in her lifetime.  With longevity trending towards uniform and stable values worldwide, the main driver of future population growth will be the evolution of the fertility rate.

Where fertility is high, demographers generally assume that fertility will decline and eventually stabilize at about two children per woman.

During the period 2015–2020, the average world fertility rate was 2.5 children per woman, about half the level in 1950-1955 (5 children per woman). In the medium variant, global fertility is projected to decline further to 2.2 in 2045-2050 and to 1.8 in 2095–2100.

Mortality 
If the mortality rate is relatively high and the resulting life expectancy is therefore relatively low, changes in mortality can have a material impact on population growth. Where the mortality rate is low and life expectancy has therefore risen, a change in mortality will have much less of an effect.

Because child mortality has declined substantially over the last several decades, global life expectancy at birth, has risen from 48 years in 1950–1955 to 67 years in 2000–2005, is expected to keep rising to reach 77 years in 2045–2050 and 83 years in 2095-2100. In the more Developed regions, the projected increase is from 76 years during the period 2000-2005 to 84 years during the period 2045-2050 and 90 in 2095-2100. Among the Less Developed countries, where life expectancy during the period 2000-2005 was just under 66 years, it is expected to be 76 years in 2045–2050 and 81 years by 2100.

Migration 

Migration can have a significant effect on population change. Global South-South migration accounts for 38% of total migration, and Global South-North for 34%. For example, the United Nations reports that during the period 2010–2020, fourteen countries will have seen a net inflow of more than one million migrants, while ten countries will have seen a net outflow of similar proportions. The largest migratory outflows have been in response to demand for workers in other countries (Bangladesh, Nepal and the Philippines) or to insecurity in the home country (Myanmar, Syria and Venezuela). Belarus, Estonia, Germany, Hungary, Italy, Japan, the Russian Federation, Serbia and Ukraine have experienced a net inflow of migrants over the decade, helping to offset population losses caused by a negative natural increase (births minus deaths).

World population projections 

This section describes near-term population changes, up to the year 2050, and long-term population changes, out to the year 2100.

Up to 2050 
The median scenario of the UN's 2022 World Population Prospects predicts the following populations per region in 2050 compared to population in 2000,and shows the differing growth rates for each over the first half of this century.

After 2050 
Projections of population beyond the year 2050 tend to vary depending on the organization making them because each will be making their own assumptions of the drivers of population change: fertility, mortality and migration.

United Nations projections 
The UN Population Division report of 2022 projects world population to continue growing after 2050, although at a steadily decreasing rate, to peak at 10.4 billion in 2086, and then to start a slow decline to about 10.3 billion in 2100 with a growth rate at that time of -0.1%.

This projected growth of population, like all others, depends on assumptions about vital rates. For example, the chart below shows that the UN Population Division assumes that Total fertility rate (TFR), which has been steadily declining since 1963, will continue to decline, at varying paces depending on circumstances in individual regions, to a below-replacement level of 1.8 by 2100. Between now (2020) and 2100, regions with TFR currently below this rate, e.g. Europe, will see TFR rise.  Regions with TFR above this rate, will see TFR continue to decline.

Other projections 
Other organizations have published different forecasts.
 A 2020 study published by The Lancet from researchers funded by the Global Burden of Disease Study promotes a lower growth scenario, projecting that world population will peak in 2064 at 9.7 billion and then decline to 8.8 billion in 2100. This projection assumes further advancement of women's rights globally. In this case TFR is assumed to decline more rapidly than the UN's projection, to reach 1.7 in 2100.
An analysis from the Wittgenstein Center IIASA predicts global population to peak in 2070 at 9.4 billion and then decline to 9.0 billion in 2100.
The Institute for Health Metrics and Evaluation (IHME) and the Insurance Institute of South Africa (IIASA) project lower fertility in Sub-Saharan Africa (SSA) in 2100 than the UN. By 2100, the UN projects the population in SSA will reach 3.8 billion, IHME projects 3.1 billion, and IIASA projects 2.6 billion. IHME and IIASA incorporate women's educational attainment in their models of fertility, and in the case of IHME, also consider met need for family planning.
Other assumptions can produce other results.  Some of the authors of the 2004 UN report assumed that life expectancy would rise slowly and continuously. The projections in the report assume this with no upper limit, though at a slowing pace depending on circumstances in individual countries. By 2100, the report assumed life expectancy to be from 66 to 97 years, and by 2300 from 87 to 106 years, depending on the country. Based on that assumption, they expect that rising life expectancy will produce small but continuing population growth by the end of the projections, ranging from 0.03 to 0.07 percent annually. The hypothetical feasibility (and wide availability) of life extension by technological means would further contribute to long term (beyond 2100) population growth.

Evolutionary biology also suggests the demographic transition may reverse itself and global population may continue to grow in the long term. In addition, recent evidence suggests birth rates may be rising in the 21st century in the developed world.

Growth regions 
The table below shows that from 2020 to 2050 and beyond to 2100, the bulk of the world's population growth is projected to take place in Africa. Of the additional 1.9 billion people projected between 2020 and 2050, 1.2 billion will be added in Africa, 0.7 billion in Asia and zero in the rest of the world. Africa's share of global population is projected to grow from 17% in 2020 to 25% in 2050 and 38% by 2100, while the share of Asia will fall from 60% in 2020 to 55% in 2050 and 45% in 2100.  The strong growth of the African population will happen regardless of the rate of decrease of fertility, because of the exceptional proportion of young people already living today. For example, the UN projects that the population of Nigeria will surpass that of the United States by about 2050.

The population of the More Developed regions is slated to remain mostly unchanged, at 1.2-1.3 billion for the remainder of the 21st century. All population growth comes from the Less Developed regions.

The table below breaks out the UN's future population growth predictions by region

The UN projects that between 2020 and 2100 there will be declines in population growth in all six regions, that by 2100 three of them will be undergoing population decline, and the world will have entered a period of global population decline.

Most populous nations by 2050 and 2100 

The UN Population Division has calculated the future population of the world's countries, based on current demographic trends.  Current (2021) world population is 7.9 billion. The UN's 2022 report projects world population to be 9.7 billion people in 2050, and about 10.3 billion by 2100. The following table shows the largest 14 countries by population as of 2020 and shows how the rankings will change between now and the end of this century.

From 2020 to 2050, the eight highlighted countries are expected to account for about half of the world's projected population increase: India, Nigeria, the Democratic Republic of the Congo, Pakistan, Ethiopia, Tanzania, Egypt, and Indonesia.

Population projections of the largest metropolitan areas 
Large urban areas are hubs of economic development and innovation, with larger cities underpinning regional economies and local and global sustainability initiatives. Currently, 757 million humans live in the 101 largest cities; these cities are home to 11% of the world's population. By the end of the century, the world population is projected to grow, with estimates ranging from 6.9 billion to 13.1 billion; the percentage of people living in the 101 largest cities is estimated to be 15% to 23%.

The following 101 metropolitan areas with the largest population projections for the years 2025, 2050, 2075, and 2100, according to professors Daniel Hoornweg and Kevin Pope, are listed below.

See also 
 Future generations
 Population projection
 Population growth
 Estimates of historical world population
 Human overpopulation
 Pledge two or fewer (campaign for smaller families)
 List of sovereign states and dependencies by total fertility rate
 List of countries by number of births

References 

Population statistics
Human overpopulation
Population ecology
Environmental controversies